Tadeusz Brzozowski (1918–1987) was a Polish painter.

External links
Tadeusz Brzozowski Biography

20th-century Polish painters
20th-century Polish male artists
1918 births
1987 deaths
Polish male painters